This is a list of rural localities in Buryatia. Formerly part of the Siberian Federal District, it is part of the Russian Far East since 2018. Its capital is the city of Ulan-Ude.

Barguzinsky District 
Rural localities in Barguzinsky District:

 Adamovo
 Barguzin
 Bayangol
 Bodon
 Borogol
 Chitkan
 Dushelan
 Gusikha
 Ina
 Katun
 Khara-Usun
 Khilgana
 Kurbulik
 Makarinino
 Maloye Uro
 Maximikha
 Monakhovo
 Nesterikha
 Shapenkovo
 Soyol
 Sukhaya
 Suvo
 Ulyukchikan
 Ulyun
 Uro
 Urzhil
 Yarikta
 Yubileyny
 Zhuravlikha
 Zorino

Bauntovsky District 
Rural localities in Bauntovsky District:

 Baunt
 Bugunda
 Busani
 Karaftit
 Kurort Baunt
 Malovsky
 Maly Amalat
 Mongoy
 Okunevo
 Romanovka
 Rossoshino
 Severny
 Troitsky
 Tsipikan
 Uakit
 Ust-Antose
 Ust-Dzhilinda
 Uya
 Varvarinsky

Bauntovsky Evenkiysky District 
Rural localities in Bauntovsky Evenkiysky District:

 Bagdarin

Bichursky District 
Rural localities in Bichursky District:

 Altachey
 Amagalantuy
 Ara-Kiret
 Bichura
 Bilyutay
 Buy
 Dabatuy
 Deben
 Dunda-Kiret
 Elan
 Gutay
 Kharlun
 Khayan
 Khonkholoy
 Maly Kunaley
 Motnya
 Nizhny Mangirtuy
 Novosretenka
 Okino-Klyuchi
 Petropavlovka
 Podgornoye
 Pokrovka
 Poselye
 Potanino
 Sakharny Zavod
 Shanaga
 Shibertuy
 Sloboda
 Sredny Kharlun
 Starye Klyuchi
 Sudutuy
 Sukhoy Ruchey
 Topka
 Ust-Zagan
 Uzky Lug
 Verkhny Mangirtuy

Dzhidinsky District 
Rural localities in Dzhidinsky District:

 Altsak
 Armak
 Bayan
 Beloozyorsk
 Borgoy
 Botsy
 Bulyk
 Dede-Ichyotuy
 Dodo-Ichyotuy
 Dyrestuy
 Dzhida
 Gegetuy
 Inzagatuy
 Khuldat
 Khuzhir
 Maly Naryn
 Naryn
 Nizhny Burgaltay
 Nizhny Torey
 Nyuguy
 Oyor
 Petropavlovka
 Podkhuldochi
 Shartykey
 Stary Ukyrchelon
 Tasarkhay
 Tengerek
 Tokhoy
 Tsagan-Usun
 Tsagatuy
 Ulzar
 Verkhny Burgaltay
 Verkhny Torey
 Verkhny Yonkhor
 Yonkhor
 Zarubino
 Zheltura

Ivolginsky District 
Rural localities in Ivolginsky District:

 Barun-Orongoy
 Ganzurino
 Ganzurino
 Gilbira
 Gurulba
 Ivolginsk
 Kalyonovo
 Khoytobeye
 Khuramsha
 Kibalino
 Klyuchi
 Kokorino
 Kolobki
 Krasnoyarovo
 Nizhnyaya Ivolga
 Nur-Seleniye
 Orongoy
 Orongoy
 Oshurkovo
 Poselye
 Shaluta
 Sotnikovo
 Suzha
 Tapkhar
 Ulan-Ivolginsky
 Verkhnyaya Ivolga
 Zun-Orongoy

Kabansky District 
Rural localities in Kabansky District:

 Baykalsky Priboy
 Beregovaya
 Bolshaya Rechka
 Bolshoye Kolesovo
 Borki
 Boyarsky
 Bryansk
 Bykovo
 Dubinino
 Dulan
 Fofonovo
 Gorny
 Inkino
 Istok
 Istomino
 Ivanovka
 Kabansk
 Kargino
 Kedrovaya
 Khandala
 Klyuyevka
 Korsakovo
 Krasny Yar
 Kudara
 Maloye Kolesovo
 Manturikha
 Mishikha
 Murzino
 Nikolsk
 Novaya Derevnya
 Novy Enkheluk
 Nyuki
 Oymur
 Pereyomnaya
 Polevoy
 Posolskaya
 Posolskoye
 Priboy
 Ranzhurovo
 Rechka Mishikha
 Rechka Vydrino
 Romanovo
 Sherashovo
 Shergino
 Shigayevo
 Stepnoy Dvorets
 Sukhaya
 Tankhoy
 Tarakanovka
 Timlyuy
 Tolbazikha
 Treskovo
 Tvorogovo
 Vydrino
 Vydrino
 Yelan
 Zakaltus
 Zarechye
 Zhilino

Khorinsky District 
Rural localities in Khorinsky District:

 Alan
 Amgalanta
 Aninsk
 Ashanga
 Barun-Khasurta
 Bayan-Gol
 Bulum
 Georgiyevskoye
 Khandagay
 Khasurta
 Khorinsk
 Kulsk
 Kulsky Stanok
 Malaya Kurba
 Mayla
 Mogoy
 Naryn
 Oninoborsk
 Oybont
 Sannomysk
 Tarbagatay
 Tegda
 Tokhoryukta
 Udinsk
 Verkhniye Taltsy
 Zun-Khuray

Kizhinginsky District 
Rural localities in Kizhinginsky District:

 Bakhlayta
 Bulak
 Chesan
 Edermeg
 Innokentyevka
 Khurtey
 Kizhinga
 Kodunsky Stanok
 Krasny Yar
 Kulkison
 Kuorka
 Leonovka
 Mikhaylovka
 Mogsokhon
 Novokizhinginsk
 Orot
 Sulkhara
 Ulzyte
 Ushkhayta
 Ust-Orot
 Zagustay

Kurumkansky District 
Rural localities in Kurumkansky District:

 Alla
 Arbun
 Argada
 Arzgun
 Baragkhan
 Bulag
 Elesun
 Galgatay
 Garga
 Kharamodun
 Khargana
 Khonkhino
 Kucheger
 Kurumkan
 Maysky
 Mogoyto
 Murgun
 Nama
 Sakhuli
 Shamanka
 Taza
 Tomokto
 Tungen
 Ugnasay
 Ulyunkhan
 Unegetey
 Yagdyg

Kyakhtinsky District 
Rural localities in Kyakhtinsky District:

 Anagustay
 Ara-Altsagat
 Bolshaya Kudara
 Bolshoy Lug
 Burduny
 Chikoy
 Dunguy
 Dureny
 Enkhe-Tala
 Ivanovka
 Kalinishna
 Khamnigaday
 Kharyasta
 Khilgantuy
 Kholoy
 Khoronkhoy
 Khutor
 Kiran
 Kudara-Somon
 Kurort Kiran
 Malaya Kudara
 Murochi
 Novodesyatnikovo
 Oktyabrsky
 Pervomayskoye
 Polkanovo
 Semyonovka
 Sharagol
 Shazagay
 Subuktuy
 Sudzha
 Tamir
 Tsagan-Chelutay
 Ubur-Kiret
 Ulady
 Ungurkuy
 Ust-Dunguy
 Ust-Kiran
 Ust-Kyakhta
 Verkhniye Murochi

Mukhorshibirsky District 
Rural localities in Mukhorshibirsky District:

 Balta
 Bar
 Bom
 Chernoyarovo
 Galtay
 Gashey
 Kalinovka
 Kharashibir
 Kharyastka
 Khonkholoy
 Khoshun-Uzur
 Kugoty
 Kusoty
 Mukhorshibir
 Narsata
 Nikolsk
 Novospassk
 Novy Zagan
 Podlopatki
 Sagan-Nur
 Sharalday
 Shinestuy
 Stary Zagan
 Stepnoy
 Tsolga
 Tugnuy
 Ust-Altasha
 Verhny Sutay
 Zandin

Muysky District 
Rural localities in Muysky District:

 Bambuyka
 Bargalino
 Irakinda
 Muya
 Ust-Muya
 Vitim

Okinsky District 
Rural localities in Okinsky District:

 Alag-Shulun
 Angir
 Balakta
 Baturino
 Bokson
 Botogol
 Burdukovo
 Burlya
 Cheryomushka
 Goryachinsk
 Gremyachinsk
 Gurulyovo
 Ilyinka
 Irkilik
 Istok
 Itantsa
 Karymsk
 Khalzanovo
 Khara-Khuzhir
 Khurga
 Khuzhir
 Kika
 Klochnevo
 Koma
 Kotokel
 Lesovozny
 Listvennichnoye
 Mostovka
 Nesterovo
 Orlik
 Ostrog
 Pokrovka
 Samarta
 Sayany
 Sharza
 Shasnur
 Sobolikha
 Sorok
 Staroye Tataurovo
 Subarya
 Talovka
 Talovka
 Tataurovo
 Troitskoye
 Turka
 Yartsy
 Yelovka
 Yugovo
 Zasukhino
 Zolotoy Klyuch
 Zun-Kholba
 Zyryansk

Pribaykalsky District 
Rural localities in Pribaykalsky District:

 Turuntayevo

Selenginsky District 
Rural localities in Selenginsky District:

 Ardasan
 Baraty
 Bilyutay
 Bulak
 Burgastay
 Deben
 Dede-Sutoy
 Gusinoye Ozero
 Khargana
 Mengey
 Nizhny Ubukun
 Novoselenginsk
 Nur-Tukhum
 Povorot
 Selenduma
 Shana
 Sosnovka
 Sredny Ubukun
 Sulfat
 Tashir
 Tayozhny
 Temnik
 Tokhoy
 Tsaydam
 Tukhum
 Ubukun
 Udunga
 Ust-Urma
 Yagodnoye
 Yekhe-Tsagan
 Yenhor
 Zalan
 Zaozerny
 Zhargalanta
 Zurgan-Debe

Severo-Baykalsky District 
Rural localities in Severo-Baykalsky District:

 Angoya
 Baykalskoye
 Davsha
 Dushkachan
 Kholodnaya
 Kumora
 Uoyan
 Verkhnyaya Zaimka

Tarbagataysky District 
Rural localities in Tarbagataysky District:

 Barykino
 Barykino-Klyuchi
 Bolshoy Kunaley
 Burnashevo
 Desyatnikovo
 Kardon
 Khandagatay
 Kharitonovo
 Kuytun
 Lesnoy
 Nadeyino
 Nikolayevsky
 Nizhny Sayantuy
 Nizhny Zhirim
 Pesterovo
 Saratovka
 Sayantuy
 Selenga
 Solontsy
 Tarbagatay
 Verkhny Sayantuy
 Verkhny Zhirim
 Voznesenovka

Tunkinsky District 
Rural localities in Tunkinsky District:

 Akhalik
 Dalakhay
 Galbay
 Guzhiry
 Kharbyaty
 Khongodory
 Khoyto-Gol
 Khuray-Khobok
 Khuzhiry
 Kyren
 Maly Zhemchug
 Mogoy-Gorkhon
 Mondy
 Moygoty
 Nikolsk
 Nilovka
 Nugan
 Okhor-Shibir
 Shanay
 Shimki
 Shuluta
 Tabalangut
 Tagarkhay
 Taloye
 Tory
 Tunka
 Turan
 Ulan-Gorkhon
 Ulbugay
 Yelovka
 Yengorga
 Zaktuy
 Zhemchug
 Zun-Murino

Yeravninsky District 
Rural localities in Yeravninsky District:

 Domna
 Egita
 Garam
 Gonda
 Gunda
 Isinga
 Khangir
 Khorga
 Komsomolskoye
 Mozhayka
 Ozerny
 Poperechnoye
 Shiringa
 Sosnovo-Ozerskoye
 Telemba
 Tselinny
 Tuldun
 Tuzhinka
 Ukyr
 Uldurga
 Ulzyte
 Ust-Egita

Zaigrayevsky District 
Rural localities in Zaigrayevsky District:

 Angir
 Atkhatay
 Blok-post imeni Serova
 Chelutay
 Chelutay
 Chelutay
 Dabata
 Darkhhita
 Dede-Tala
 Dobo-Yonkhor
 Erkhirik
 Gorkhon
 Ilka
 Khara-Kutul
 Khara-Shibir
 Khotogor
 Kizha
 Krasny Yar
 Lesozavodskoy
 Mukhor-Tala
 Naryn
 Naryn-Atsagat
 Naryn-Shibir
 Nizhniye Taltsy
 Novaya Bryan
 Novaya Kurba
 Novoilyinsk
 Onokhoy-Shibir
 Pervomayevka
 Petropavlovka
 Shabur
 Shene-Busa
 Shuluta
 Staraya Bryan
 Staraya Kurba
 Stary Onokhoy
 Tarbagatay
 Tarbagatayka
 Tashelan
 Tatarsky Klyuch
 Todogto
 Unegetey
 Ust-Bryan

Zakamensky District 
Rural localities in Zakamensky District:

 Bayangol
 Bortoi
 Burguy
 Dalakhay
 Darkhintuy
 Dutulur
 Khamney
 Kharatsay
 Khatsura
 Kholtoson
 Khurtaga
 Khuzhir
 Mikhaylovka
 Myla
 Nurta
 Sanaga
 Shara-Azarga
 Tsagan-Morin
 Tsakir
 Ulekchin
 Ulentuy
 Usanovka
 Ust-Burgaltay
 Utata
 Yekhe-Tsakir
 Yengorboy

See also 
 
 Lists of rural localities in Russia

References 

Buryatia